Stereocaulon botryosum is a species of snow lichen belonging to the family Stereocaulaceae.

Ecology
Stereocaulon botryosum is a known host to the lichenicolous fungus species:

 Arthonia stereocaulina
 Catillaria stereocaulorum
 Cercidospora stereocaulorum
 Endococcus nanellus
 Lasiosphaeriopsis stereocaulicola
 Lichenopeltella stereocaulorum
 Opegrapha stereocaulicola
 Taeniolella christiansenii

References

Lichen species
Lichens described in 1810
Stereocaulaceae
Taxa named by Erik Acharius